Karakız Lake is an artificial pond in Mersin Province, Turkey.

Geography 
The lake was formed in 1998. It is on Toros Mountains in the rural area of Erdemli district. Its main water source is Karakız Creek. It is at the east of  the village Hacıalanı which actually is a yayla (summer resort). The lake discharges to Tömük Creek.

Uses 
The lake is used for irrigation. It is also a popular picnic and fishing area. In the future it may further be used for sports. Mersin Union of Industrialists proposes to establish a winter sports complex around the lake.

References 

Karakiz
Landforms of Mersin Province
Erdemli District
Tourist attractions in Mersin Province